John Fairbrother (16 August 1917 – October 1999, born in Burton upon Trent, Staffordshire) was an English professional football goalkeeper, best known for his time at Newcastle United shortly after the Second World War where he won a FA Cup winners medal in the 1951 cup final against Blackpool. His uncle George Harrison played for Everton and England.

He became the coach of Maccabi Petah Tikva in 1958, where he stayed until January 1959.

References

External links

1917 births
1999 deaths
English footballers
Preston North End F.C. players
Newcastle United F.C. players
Peterborough United F.C. players
English football managers
Gateshead A.F.C. managers
Peterborough United F.C. managers
Coventry City F.C. managers
Maccabi Petah Tikva F.C. managers
Sportspeople from Burton upon Trent
English Football League representative players
Association football goalkeepers
FA Cup Final players